Bundang Jesaeng Hospital (분당제생병원) (also known as Daejin Medical Center) is a general hospital located in Seohyeon-dong, Bundang-gu, Seongnam, South Korea. It is one of the Daejin Medical Centers and was built on 15 January 1995 by Daejin Medical Foundation which is owned by Daesunjinrihoe.

Trivia
A 2006 SBS TV series, Alone in Love took shots in this hospital.

See also
Daesunjinrihoe

External links
Official Website (Korean)

Hospital buildings completed in 1995
Bundang
Hospitals in South Korea
Hospitals established in 1995
Buildings and structures in Gyeonggi Province
1995 establishments in South Korea